Shaquille Vance (born March 22, 1991) is an American T42 Paralympic sprint runner and shot putter. Vance lost his leg in an American football accident in 2009. Two weeks after surgery to repair the damaged leg, no blood was circulating to his foot so his leg was removed. Before losing his leg, he was a linebacker and wide receiver for the Houston Hilltoppers.

At the 2012 Paralympic Games, Vance won a silver medal in the 200 m event in a time of 25.55 seconds, setting a new American record. He also placed sixth in the shot put and eighth in the 100 m. He won the 100 m event at the 2011 and 2015 Parapan American Games.

References

Living people
Paralympic track and field athletes of the United States
Paralympic silver medalists for the United States
American male sprinters
1991 births
Medalists at the 2012 Summer Paralympics
Athletes (track and field) at the 2012 Summer Paralympics
Paralympic medalists in athletics (track and field)
Medalists at the 2011 Parapan American Games
Medalists at the 2015 Parapan American Games
People from Houston, Mississippi
Track and field athletes from Mississippi